Poimenesperus dobraei is a species of beetle in the family Cerambycidae. It was described by Waterhouse in 1881, originally under the genus Poemenesperus.

References

dobraei
Beetles described in 1881